Aleksandar Markov (born 17 August 1961) is a Bulgarian former footballer who played as a defender. He played for Bulgaria at the 1986 FIFA World Cup, making two appearances. He also played in the qualifying campaigns for the 1986 and 1994 tournaments.

In club football, Markov spent most of his career in his native country, making 66 appearances for Levski Sofia. He finished his career with short spells at Hampton Roads Mariners and Atlanta Silverbacks in the United States.

Honours

Club 
Levski Sofia
 A PFG (3): 1992–93, 1993–94, 1994–95
 Bulgarian Cup (2): 1991–92, 1993–94

References

External links

 Profile at LevskiSofia.info

1961 births
Living people
Bulgarian footballers
Bulgaria international footballers
FC Lokomotiv 1929 Sofia players
PFC Spartak Pleven players
PFC Slavia Sofia players
PFC Levski Sofia players
Atlanta Silverbacks players
First Professional Football League (Bulgaria) players
Association football central defenders
1986 FIFA World Cup players
Bulgarian expatriate footballers
Bulgarian expatriate sportspeople in the United States